Negar Javaherian (born January 12, 1983) is an Iranian actress. She is best known for her acting in Gold and Copper (2010), Here Without Me (2011), A Cube of Sugar (2011) and The Painting Pool (2013). She has received various accolades, including a Crystal Simorgh, two Iran Cinema Celebration Awards and an Iran's Film Critics and Writers Association Award, in addition to nominations for two Hafez Awards.

Career

Translation
She also co-translated Harold Pinter's play, Betrayal along with Tinouche Nazmjou.

Filmography

Film

Web

Television

Theatre 

Divan-e Theatral – (Directed by Mahmoud Ostad Mohammad)
Red and the Others – (Directed by Mohammad Yaghoubi)
Invisible Cities – (Directed by Mohammad Hasan Majouni)
Where were you on Day the 17th? (Directed by Amir Reza Kouhestani)

Awards and nominations

References

External links

1983 births
Living people
People from Tehran
Actresses from Tehran
Iranian film actresses
Iranian child actresses
Iranian stage actresses
Iranian television actresses
21st-century Iranian actresses
Islamic Azad University alumni
Crystal Simorgh for Best Actress winners